Hojjatoleslam Seyed Sajjad Izdehi is an Iranian political scientist and associate professor of politics at the Research Institute for Islamic Culture and Thought. His book titled Supervision on the power in the political jurisprudence won the Farabi Award and Howzeh Book of the Year Award.

Works
 Clergy and politics : issues and consequences 
 Supervision on the power in the political jurisprudence
 The political philosophy of Ayatollah Khamenei
 Expediency in political fiqh of Shia

References

Farabi International Award recipients
Iranian Shia scholars of Islam
Academic staff of the Research Institute for Islamic Culture and Thought
Religion academics
Living people
Iranian political scientists
1970 births